Randy William Bass (born March 13, 1954) is an American politician and former baseball player. He played in Major League Baseball (MLB) and Nippon Professional Baseball (NPB), and served in the Oklahoma Senate.

Bass made his MLB debut in 1977, and moved to NPB in 1983. He twice won the batting Triple Crown in NPB and still holds the highest single-season batting average; he is considered one of the greatest American players in Japanese baseball history. From 2005 to 2019, Bass represented the 32nd district in the Oklahoma Senate as a member of the Democratic Party.

Baseball Career

American baseball career
Bass attended Lawton High School and was named all-state in baseball and football. He received college football scholarship offers from Kansas State University and the University of Oklahoma.

The Minnesota Twins selected Bass in the seventh round of the 1972 MLB draft out of Lawton High School. He signed with the Twins rather than attend college. He was blocked at first base by Rod Carew and ran out of options after the 1977 season. In April 1978, the Twins sold Bass outright to the Triple-A Toledo Mud Hens, who sold him to the Triple-A Omaha Royals. The Royals traded Bass to the Montreal Expos for Lamont Harris in April 1979. In August 1980, the Expos traded Bass to the San Diego Padres for John D'Acquisto. The Texas Rangers acquired Bass from the Padres on waivers in May 1982.

In his six seasons in the Major Leagues (divided among five teams), he was never an everyday player, usually coming off the bench to pinch hit. Bass posted a .212 batting average in 325 at-bats with nine home runs and 42 runs batted in in 130 games played.

Japanese baseball career
After his contract expired following the  season, Bass signed with the Hanshin Tigers of Nippon Professional Baseball's Central League, who made him their starting first baseman.

Bass adapted quickly to Japanese pitching, hitting 35 home runs in his first season in 1983, and became the Tigers' star slugger for several seasons. Bass won consecutive batting Triple Crowns (1985 and 1986).

In 1985, he challenged Sadaharu Oh's record of 55 home runs in a single season, but finished the year with 54. In the last game of the season, the pitcher for the Yomiuri Giants — then managed by Oh — intentionally walked Bass each time, seemingly to prevent him from having a chance to equal or break the record.

Bass was released by Hanshin in November 1988 after he returned to the United States after his son Zach was diagnosed with brain cancer and did not return by a prescribed date. The general manager of the Hanshin Tigers, Shingo Furuya, committed suicide after negotiating with Bass over the company's liability for the medical expenses for his son.

Curse of the Colonel
Bass is also famous in Japan for the "Curse of the Colonel". Following the 1985 Central League Pennant victory, revelers celebrated by calling off the names of team members one by one. At each name, a fan who looked like that player would jump into the filthy Dōtonbori canal. For Bass, someone threw a life-sized model of Colonel Sanders, the mascot of Kentucky Fried Chicken and the only close-at-hand likeness of a bearded American, into the river. The statue disappeared and is said to have caused the team's subsequent decade-long dismal performance in the Central League. The Tigers would go on to beat the Seibu Lions to win the 1985 Japan Series. Bass would win Japan Series MVP.

Name in Japanese
The Hanshin Tigers requested the change because the corporate owner of the team, Hanshin Electric Railway Co., Ltd., directly owned a bus line (Hanshin Bus) during Bass' playing career.

Politics

After his 1988 retirement, Bass became active in community projects to promote baseball in his native state, while continuing to make trips to Japan as a cultural ambassador. Bass was elected to the Oklahoma Senate as a Democrat in 2004. He was re-elected in 2006, defeating Ed Petersen in the general election. He was again re-elected in 2010 and 2014, running unopposed in the former, and unchallenged in the latter. In the Senate, he served as the co-chair of the Appropriations Subcommittee Natural Resources and Regulatory Services. He also sat on the Appropriations, Retirement and Insurance, General Government and Judiciary Committees.

Bass was ineligible to run for reelection in 2018 due to term limits.

References

External links

1954 births
Living people
Major League Baseball first basemen
Baseball players from Oklahoma
Minnesota Twins players
Kansas City Royals players
Montreal Expos players
San Diego Padres players
Texas Rangers players
Hanshin Tigers players
Melbourne Twins players
Omaha Royals players
Denver Bears players
Tacoma Twins players
Lynchburg Twins players
Wisconsin Rapids Twins players
American expatriate baseball players in Canada
American expatriate baseball players in Japan
Democratic Party Oklahoma state senators
People from Lawton, Oklahoma
American athlete-politicians
Nippon Professional Baseball MVP Award winners
Orlando Juice players
Sportspeople from Lawton, Oklahoma
American Association (1902–1997) MVP Award winners
21st-century American politicians
Japanese Baseball Hall of Fame inductees